Nahal Betzet (lit. "Betzet stream"), Arabic: Wadi Karkara, is a once-perennial and now intermittent stream in the Upper Galilee, Israel. Most of it is part of the nature reserve named for the stream.

Geography

The stream crosses the border from Lebanon into Israel between Shtula and Zar'it, and flows westward, emptying into the Mediterranean Sea south of Rosh HaNikra. The stream runs along a geological fault line through dolomite and limestone, and is fed along its course by springs. Currently, Mekorot (the national water company) pumps the water of the stream's springs, and has been accused of causing the stream to dry up. Many caves are formed on the banks of the stream, most notably the arch known as Keshet Cave (Rainbow Cave).

Nature reserve
Most of the stream is part of a nature reserve that bears its name. The reserve, declared in 1972 covers 7650-dunam and part of it reaches the Israel-Lebanese border. In 2009, 1225 dunams were added to the reserve.

Flora in the area includes Nerium oleander, Platanus orientalis, and Adiantum capillus-veneris.

References

External links
 Real Estate Developers and Environmentalists Clash Over Nahal Betzet Beach in Western Galilee
 Hike in Nahal Betzet

Rivers of Israel
Nature reserves in Israel
Upper Galilee